is a Japanese volleyball player who represented her native country in 1993, 1994, 1996, and 1997. She was born in Sakai, Ibaraki, Japan.

Fujiyoshi was a straight-left-hander.  She played basketball from 1983 to 1990 but switched to volleyball in April 1990 on entering Ryugasaki Daini High School.  She played for the Hitachi Belles Filles in 1993.  In 1994, she competed in the FIVB Volleyball Women's World Championship.  She retired because of her injury on May 31, 2001.

References 
 the series of magazines Gekkan Volleyball by Nihon Bunka Shuppan in Japan (This series is written 月刊バレーボール in Japanese).

Living people
Japanese women's volleyball players
1974 births
Sportspeople from Ibaraki Prefecture
Goodwill Games medalists in volleyball
Competitors at the 1994 Goodwill Games